Herrenberg (Swabian: Härrabärg or Haerebärg) is a town in the middle of Baden-Württemberg, about 30 km
south of Stuttgart and 20 km from Tübingen. After Sindelfingen, Böblingen, and Leonberg, it is the fourth largest town in the district of Böblingen.

Location
Herrenberg is situated on the western edge of the Schönbuch forest and is a central town within the Gäu region. The Stiftskirche, which houses the Glockenmuseum (bell museum), is a tourist attraction in the main square.

The following towns and municipalities border Herrenberg. They are listed in clockwise direction beginning in the north:

Deckenpfronn, Gärtringen, Nufringen, Hildrizhausen and Altdorf (all Böblingen district), Ammerbuch (Tübingen district), Gäufelden and Jettingen (both Böblingen district) as well as Wildberg (Calw district).

History
The once small community Herrenberg was formed out of the hamlets "Mühlhausen" and "Raistingen", who were combinated in the 13th century, when Herrenberg was founded. In 1278, Herrenberg was first documented, although Pfalzgraf Rudolf von Tübingen already wrote in 1228 "castrum nostrum herrenberc" into a certificate. From 1276, the church building was started, which at the time, had two towers.

The supposed founder of the Rosicrucian movement in Europe, Johann Valentin Andreae, who also wrote The Chemical Wedding of Christian Rosenkreutz, was born in Herrenberg on 17 August 1586.

Town arrangement
Herrenberg consists of the town centre and the 7 additional towns which were merged in the regional reorganization of the 1960s and 1970s. The number of inhabitants of Herrenberg exceeded 20,000 in 1972 due to the incorporation of the following formerly independent municipalities:
1965: Affstätt
1971: Haslach, Kayh, Kuppingen, and Mönchberg
1972: Oberjesingen
1975: Gültstein

In each different area of Herrenberg there is an office for the district and a town clerk.

Population

 ¹ Census results
 ² Herrenberg Amtsblatt 23 November 2006

Politics
The local council has, since the last election on 13 June 2004, has a total of 40 Seats. 
The distribution of the different parties and groups are as follows: (in German)
CDU 30,6% (-2,4) - 13 Seats (-1)
FW 21,8% (-2,3) - 9 Seats (-1)
SPD 21,9% (+0,4) - 9 Seats (=)
Grüne 16,3% (+5,6) - 6 Seats (+2)
Frauenliste 9,4% (+2,4) - 3 Seats (+1)
Others 0,0% (-3,7) - 0 Seats (-1)

Business
Internationally known businesses located in Herrenberg include:
 Frog Design (industrial design)
 IBM (IT training and sales)
 Omega Pharma (pharmaceuticals)
 Walter Knoll (furniture)

Transport

Herrenberg station is on the Stuttgart–Horb railway and is at the start of the Ammer Valley Railway (Ammertalbahn) It is the southern end of services on line S1 of the Stuttgart S-Bahn. It also has connections, via the A81, to Stuttgart and northern Germany. To the south the A81 provides access to Switzerland, Austria and Italy. Herrenberg is also close to Strasbourg, which is only about 110 km  to the west.

Tourism

Herrenberg has several hotels as well as accommodations in smaller guest houses in the Old Town. The Old Town has many restaurants including; Italian, Chinese, Indian, Greek, Mexican and German cuisine. There are also ice cream shops and cafes. The Stadtfest (town festival) is held annually in July. 25,000 people turn up for the town festival to celebrate, drink, and listen to the live music in the squares.

Sights
The symbol of the town, the traditional church "Stiftskirche", with its Glockenmuseum (bell museum) the tower, as well as the "Herrenberger Rathaus" (town hall) and the historical ruins of the castle "Schlossberg", are an attractive destination for tourists of all over the world. There are guided tours (some in English) as well through the historical buildings of the town. Large sections of the old city wall are still standing (or have been rebuilt) and numerous timber-framed houses fill the "Old Town" surrounding the "Marktplatz" (market place).

Sport
The Baseball & Softball Club Herrenberg Wanderers' men's team played in the Baseball Bundesliga in 2002 and 2004, and since 2007 the women have been represented in the 1st Softball Bundesliga. In 1999, the youth team became German champions.

The first men's handball team, SG H2Ku Herrenberg (SGH2Ku), secured the championship title in the Southern Regional League on the last matchday of the 2009–2010 season and thus promotion to the 2nd Handball Bundesliga, the second handball league. The SG finished the 2010–2011 season in 14th place, which was not enough to stay in the 2nd Handball League due to the league restructuring. The SG played in the 3rd league in the 2011–2012 season. In June 2011, the team was renamed SG H2Ku Herrenberg. The female A-youth team became German runner-up in the 2002–2003 season.

Currently, there is one major football club in Herrenberg called VfL Herrenberg, which plays in the Bezirksliga, the eighth step of the German football league system.

Twin towns – sister cities

Herrenberg is twinned with:
 Fidenza, Italy
 Tarare, France

References

Böblingen (district)
Württemberg